Paolina Loredan of the noble Loredan family was the Dogaressa of Venice by marriage to Doge Carlo Contarini (r. 1655-1656). 

Paolina Loredan was born to Lorenzo Loredan and married Carlo Contarini in 1600. She was known for her decision never to appear in any public ceremonial. Described as an "immensely stout woman and unusually plain-looking", she was reportedly afraid that "the salutations of the populace would not partake of their usually complimentary character", and that she would have been mocked because of her appearance. 

Both she and her spouse were known as the benefactors of the clergy, for which their busts were placed on the facade of the church of San Vidal, sculptured by Giuseppe Guoccola.

References 

 Staley, Edgcumbe:   The dogaressas of Venice : The wives of the doges, London : T. W. Laurie, 1910

17th-century Venetian people
Year of death missing
Dogaressas of Venice
Year of birth missing
17th-century Venetian women
Loredan family